The BRP Lake Caliraya (AF-81) was a Philippine Navy small replenishment tanker. She was formerly a double-hulled oil products tanker of the now defunct Philippine National Oil Company (PNOC) Shipping and Transport Corporation, and was donated to the Philippine Navy in 2014 together with 2 other tankers of the company. She is currently the only Chinese-made naval asset of the Philippine Navy.

She has a deadweight of 4,570 tons. The ship is a single product replenishment platform that has a depot-to-ship, ship-to-depot, and a ship-to-ship refueling capabilities, and with Lt. Cmdr. Mamerto A Goleta (PN) as its first commanding officer. The ship was crewed by selected officers of the Sealift Amphibious Force.

The ship was decommissioned on 17 December 2020, after the Philippine Navy found the ship to have several mechanical and electrical issues wherein repairs and further work are impractical to do.

References

External links
Philippine Navy Official website
Timawa Philippine Defense Forum
Naming and Code Designation of PN Ships

2007 ships
Auxiliary ships of the Philippine Navy
Ships built in China